Radipole was a railway station serving Radipole a northern area of Weymouth in the county of Dorset in England.

History
Opened by the GWR as Radipole Halt on 1 July 1905, it was part of a scheme by the railway company to counter road competition, particularly from Weymouth's buses. When built, its two short platforms had GWR pagoda shelters but these rusted and were replaced with bus shelters in 1978. The word Halt was dropped from its title (and from that of other surviving BR stations where it had previously appeared) on 5 May 1969.

No further services called at Radipole after 31 December 1983 as, according to the Southern Region of British Railways, its wooden platforms had become "too unsafe for use to continue". At the time, the Department for Transport was considering a proposal to withdraw passenger services from the station and British Rail had stated that heavy expenditure on repairs was not justified whilst the station's future was in doubt. Official consent was received in January 1984 and the official date of closure was 6 February 1984. In 2015, a British Rail map showing the station could still be seen at Yeovil Pen Mill station.

The site today
Little now remains of the halt although the places in the wall where the access paths were bricked up can still be seen. Trains still pass on the Heart of Wessex Line and the South West Main Line.

References

External links
 www.disused-stations.org.uk Radipole
 The station on navigable 1946 O. S. map

Further reading
   ISBN(no ISBN)

Disused railway stations in Dorset
Former Great Western Railway stations
Railway stations in Great Britain opened in 1905
Railway stations in Great Britain closed in 1984